The Dormie Network Classic was a golf tournament on the Korn Ferry Tour. It was played in April 2019 at Briggs Ranch Golf Club in San Antonio, Texas. Zhang Xinjun won the tournament by five strokes over Lanto Griffin and Chase Seiffert. All three players would finish the Web.com Tour regular season inside the top 25 on the points list, thereby graduating to the PGA Tour.

Winners

References

External links
Coverage on the Web.com Tour's official site

Former Korn Ferry Tour events
Golf in Texas
Sports competitions in San Antonio
Recurring sporting events established in 2019
Recurring sporting events disestablished in 2019
2019 establishments in Texas